Roteiro is a municipality located in the Brazilian state of Alagoas. Its population was 6,649 (2020) and its area is 129 km².

References

Populated coastal places in Alagoas
Municipalities in Alagoas